Pescott is a surname. Notable people with the surname include:

 Edward Edgar Pescott (1872–1954), Australian naturalist
 George Pescott (1806–?), cricketer
 Richard Pescott (1905–1986), botanist
 Trevor Pescott (born 1934), Australian naturalist, conservationist, and writer

See also
 Prescott (surname)